Babel is a book by Patti Smith, published in 1978, and contains Smith's poems along with her prose, lyrics, pictures and drawings.

Contents

Radio Ethiopia 
 "Notice"
 "Italy"
 "The Tapper Extracts"
 "Grant"
 "Street of the Guides"
 "Rimbaud Dead"
 "Sohl"
 "Neo Boy"
 "Dog Dream"
 "Mirza"
 "The Stream"
 "The Dream of Rimbaud"
 "Doctor Love"

Alien to Alien 
 "Munich"
 "High on Rebellion"
 "Ain't It Strange"
 "Egypt"
 "Rape"
 "Space Monkey"
 "Suite"

Sister Morphine 
 "Notice 2"
 "Judith"
 "Georgia O'Keeffe"
 "A Fire of Unknown Origin"
 "Edie Sedgewick"
 "Judith Revisited"
 "Marianne Faithfull"
 "Sister Morphine"

Pipe Dreams 
 "Bread"
 "Sterling Forest"
 "Grass"
 "Vandal"
 "The Amazing Tale of Skunkdog"
 "Konya the Shepherd"
 "Sandayu the Separate"
 "Conteé"
 "Saba the Bird"
 "Thermos"
 "Enculé"

Mohammedia 
 "The Sheep Lady from Algiers"
 "Penicillin"
 "Robert Bresson"
 "Carnival! Carnival!"
 "k.o.d.a.k."
 "Mad Juana"
 "The Salvation of Rock"

Corps de Plane 
 "Corps de Plane"
 "Jeanne Darc"
 "Jenny"
 "Health Lantern"
 "Hymn"
 "The Ninth Hole"
 "Thread"
 "A Fleet of Deer"
 "Easter"

Babel 
 "Chain Gang"
 "Babel"
 "Pinwheels"
 "Comic Warrior"
 "Babelogue"
 "Combe"
 "Babel Field"
 "Zug Island"

Notes

External links 
 
 Babel at The New York Times Book Review

American poetry collections
Poetry by Patti Smith
1978 books
Books by Patti Smith